Sphingomonas canadensis  is an aerobic bacteria from the genus of Sphingomonas which has been isolated from a sludge pond in British Columbia in Canada.

References

Further reading

External links
Type strain of Sphingomonas canadensis at BacDive -  the Bacterial Diversity Metadatabase

canadensis
Bacteria described in 2013